Palikao could mean:

 Tighennif, Mascara, Algeria — a town also known as Palikao
 Baliqiao — a bridge and surrounding suburb of Beijing, China
 Charles Cousin-Montauban, Comte de Palikao — 31st Prime Minister of France, whose nobility name was given to the new town of Tighennif in 1870